= Clare Herald =

Irish regional website

- Type: Online newspaper
- Founded: 2007
- Website: clareherald.com

The Clare Herald or ClareHerald.com is an Irish regional news portal, based in County Clare. It was established in 2007.
